The 2017 FIL World Luge Championships took place under the auspices of the International Luge Federation at the Olympic Sliding Centre Innsbruck in Innsbruck, Austria from 27 to 29 January 2017.

Schedule
Five events were held.

Medal summary

Medal table

Medalists

References

External links
Official website

 
2017
FIL World Luge Championships
FIL World Luge Championships
Luge in Austria